Hossein Osmani ( 28 September 1930 in Darvaleh-ye Pain, Kermanshah, Iran - 26 July 2016 in Banevreh, Kermanshah, Iran) also known as Khalo Hossein Kohkan (in meaning Digging Mountain or Caveman) or Farhad the Second was an Iranian Kurd who left his village 21 years ago and started carving cliff rocks on a mountain near Banevreh City Of functions Paveh County in the Kermanshah province in Iran. He carved seven rooms in a rocky mountain, as well as his own grave. He was given the title of Farhad II, a fictional figure in the Iranian literature who agreed to carve a mountain after his love-rival, one of the Iranian kings, sends him on exile.

References

External links
Story About Khalu Hossein Kuhkan in YouTube
Hussein Osmani: Iranian Kurd politician and militant (Peshmerga) in Dead-People.com

2016 deaths
1930 births
Iranian architects
Iranian Kurdish people
Tourist attractions in Kermanshah Province
Kurdish Sunni Muslims
Kurdish nationalists